The birch casebearer moth (Coleophora comptoniella) is a moth of the family Coleophoridae. It is found in Canada, including Nova Scotia and Ontario.

The larvae feed on the leaves of Comptonia, Myrica, Betula, Alnus species. They create a spatulate leaf case.

References

comptoniella
Moths described in 1926
Moths of North America